The 2011 World Junior Ice Hockey Championships, Division I was hosted in two groups of six teams each between December 12 and 19, 2010. Group A was played in Babruysk, Belarus between December 13 and December 19, 2010. Group B was played in Bled, Slovenia between December 12 and December 18, 2010.  In addition to the usual promotion and relegation, the format (following this year) changed from two parallel tournaments, to two tiered tournaments.  This means that the teams who finished 2nd and 3rd will be grouped together with the two relegated teams from the top division, and the teams who finished 4th and 5th will be grouped with the two promoted teams from Division II.

Group A

All times local (EET/UTC+2)

Statistics

Top 10 scorers

source: IIHF.com

Goaltending leaders 
(minimum 40% team's total ice time)

source: IIHF.com

IIHF Directorate awards
 Goaltender:  Ben Bowns
 Defenceman:  Ralfs Freibergs
 Forward:  Nikolai Suslo

Group B

All times local (CET/UTC+1)

Statistics

Top 10 scorers

source: IIHF.com

Goaltending leaders 
(minimum 40% team's total ice time)

source: IIHF.com

IIHF Directorate awards
 Goaltender:  Luka Gračnar
 Defenceman:  Jesper Jensen
 Forward:  Eric Pance

References

External links 
 IIHF.com

I
World Junior Ice Hockey Championships – Division I
World
International ice hockey competitions hosted by Belarus
International ice hockey competitions hosted by Slovenia
World
Babruysk
Sport in Bled
December 2010 sports events in Europe